Ambohimangakely is a rural commune in Analamanga Region, in the  Central Highlands of Madagascar. It belongs to the district of Antananarivo Avaradrano and its populations numbers to 91,056 in 2018.

Celebrities
Hasina Malalaharison, vice-world champion 2017  Pétanque

References

Populated places in Analamanga